

Biography
Eldred William "Bud" Byerly (October 26, 1919 – January 26, 2012) was an American professional baseball pitcher, who played for the St. Louis Cardinals, Cincinnati Reds, Washington Senators, Boston Red Sox and San Francisco Giants of Major League Baseball (MLB).

Although he never pitched more than 95 innings in a regular season, Byerly played for five Major League teams in a span of 17 years (1944–60). In 1957 while with the Senators, Byerly posted career-highs with six wins and six saves.

In his 11-season major league career, Byerly had a 22–22 record with a 3.70 ERA and 14 saves in 237 appearances. In 491 innings pitched, he allowed 519 hits and 167 bases on balls, with 209 strikeouts.

References

External links

1920 births
2012 deaths
Baseball players from Missouri
Boston Red Sox players
Cincinnati Reds players
Decatur Commodores players
Eugene Emeralds managers
Houston Buffaloes players
Louisville Colonels (minor league) players
Major League Baseball pitchers
Minneapolis Millers (baseball) players
People from Webster Groves, Missouri
Portsmouth Red Birds players
Rochester Red Wings players
Sacramento Solons players
St. Louis Cardinals players
St. Paul Saints (AA) players
San Francisco Giants players
Sportspeople from St. Louis County, Missouri
Syracuse Chiefs players
Tacoma Giants players
Tulsa Oilers (baseball) players
Washington Senators (1901–1960) players
Webster Groves High School alumni